The Royal Alexandra Interprovincial Bridge, also known as the Alexandra Bridge or Interprovincial Bridge, is a steel truss cantilever bridge spanning the Ottawa River between Ottawa, Ontario and Gatineau, Quebec. In addition to carrying vehicle traffic, a shared use pathway on the bridge for pedestrians and cyclists is maintained by the National Capital Commission.

The bridge was designated by the Canadian Society for Civil Engineering a National Historic Civil Engineering Site in June 1995. It was owned by the Canadian Pacific Railway until it was taken over by the National Capital Commission in 1970. It is now (2018) owned by the Government of Canada and maintained by Public Services and Procurement Canada (PSPC).

History

The bridge was constructed by the Canadian Pacific Railway between 1898 and 1900. Four barges were built to move steel beams into position. During the winter (1899–1900) workmen toiled day and night chopping channels to keep the ice clear for the barges to pass so that work could continue on the superstructure. Considerable construction delays were caused by the severe winter conditions. By September 1900 the four fixed support spans were complete. The Canadian Society of Civil Engineers held its annual meeting in Ottawa in order that its members might tour the bridge works and see the preparations being made for placing the centre span. The bridge's main cantilever centre span was, at the time of construction, the longest in Canada and the fourth-longest in the world. Both records are now held by the Quebec Bridge. The centre span was successfully put in place on October 7, and a locomotive made a trial run on December 12, 1900. On February 18, 1901, the bridge was officially inaugurated as the Interprovincial Bridge as it had been built by the Ottawa Interprovincial Bridge Company. The name was changed in September 1901 to the "Royal Alexandra Bridge" in honour of the new Queen during the visit of her son, the Duke of Cornwall and York, later George V.

The Royal Alexandra Interprovincial Bridge crosses the Ottawa River just east of Parliament Hill at Nepean Point in Ottawa. The bridge was designed primarily to carry CPR trains but also had a track for local electric trolley service between Ottawa and Hull, as well as a lane for carriage traffic. A large fire severely damaged the bridge in 1946, permanently terminating trolley traffic.

During the late 1950s the bridge was upgraded to carry vehicular and pedestrian traffic.  The closure of Ottawa Union Station in 1966 saw the last passenger trains use the Royal Alexandra Bridge and the railway tracks were removed as the bridge became exclusively a vehicular-pedestrian bridge.

On August 21, 1989, the bridge was the site of a noted murder. Alain Brosseau, a waiter at the Château Laurier, was walking home to his apartment in Hull after finishing his shift at 11:30 pm. On his way he passed through Major's Hill Park. The park was known as a popular gay cruising area, and six youths were also in the park searching for homosexuals to rob and attack. They saw Brosseau and followed him when he walked to the bridge, believing incorrectly that he was gay. A short way across Brosseau was first hit with a stick and then robbed. Gang member Jeffrey Lalonde then lifted Brosseau and threw him off the bridge. Brosseau was killed instantly when he hit the rocks below. Lalonde was given a life sentence, and died in jail in 2008.

The bridge is designated by the Canadian Society for Civil Engineering a National Historic Civil Engineering Site in June 1995. It was owned by the Canadian Pacific Railway until it was taken over by the National Capital Commission in 1970. It is now (2018) owned by the Government of Canada and maintained by Public Services and Procurement Canada (PSPC).

Current use

The bridge now provides an important commuter link between Ottawa and Gatineau. The roadways for vehicles are located on the centre and east decks. Centre deck road surface is paved while the east deck is a metal steel grating.

The west deck provides a panorama of the Ottawa-Gatineau skyline, the Ottawa River and Parliament Buildings. That deck is used by rollerbladers, cyclists, and pedestrians, and is on the official route of the Trans Canada Trail. The bike lane of the bridge links to two major cross-town bike paths. In Gatineau, there is the Voyageur Pathway that links the Aylmer and Gatineau sectors, while in Ottawa there is the Ottawa River Pathway's western section that links downtown to Carling Avenue. A third pathway, De l'Île, travels through the Old Hull section beside Boulevard des Allumettières (formerly called Boulevard Saint-Laurent), the road that continues after the bridge on the Gatineau side making a single stretch of road from Eardley Road to the former CFB Rockcliffe.

At both ends of the bridge are two major museums. In the Gatineau side of the river is the Canadian Museum of History while on the Ottawa side is the National Art Gallery while the Canadian Mint Museum and the former Canadian War Museum was located beside the Gallery. Also, on each end of the bridge are two major parks: Major's Hill Park (Ottawa) and Jacques Cartier Park (Gatineau) two major venues of the Canadian Tulip Festival and the Canada Day festivities.

Each day the bridge carries roughly 15,000 vehicles, 2000 pedestrians and 1300 cyclists, as of 2009. A two-year rehabilitation project which began in 2009, included various structural improvements and replacements of the centre concrete deck, the wood boardwalk and guardrails.

Nepean Point overlooks the bridge from the Ottawa side. The Rideau Canal meets the Ottawa River immediately upriver of the bridge's Ottawa abutment.

On July 16, 2011, the bridge was closed to public traffic so that an episode of the television series Michael: Tuesdays and Thursdays could be filmed.

Specifications
Type: truss bridge with five spans
Length: 563.27 m (1,848 ft)
Width: 18.89 m (62 ft)
Height of tower posts: 28.95 m (95 ft)
Length of main cantilever span: 172.21 m (556 ft)

See also 
 List of bridges in Ottawa
 List of bridges in Canada
 List of crossings of the Ottawa River

References

External links
 

Canadian Pacific Railway bridges in Ontario
Rail transport in Ottawa
Railway bridges in Quebec
Bridges completed in 1900
Bridges in Ottawa
Bridges in Gatineau
Cantilever bridges in Canada
Bridges over the Ottawa River
Road bridges in Ontario
Road bridges in Quebec
Steel bridges in Canada
1900 establishments in Ontario
1900 establishments in Quebec